The chief of the General Staff of the Armed Forces of Iraq(Kurdish:سه‌رۆک ئه‌رکانی سوپای عێراق) is the chief of the General Staff of the Armed Forces of Iraq. He is appointed by the Prime Minister of Iraq, who is the commander-in-chief. The position dates to the period of the Independence of Iraq. Up until 2003, the Chief of Staff was the second most senior officer in the Armed Forces behind the Minister of Defence. 

The current chief of the General Staff is General Abdel Emir Yarallah, since 8 June 2020.

List of chiefs of the General Staff

Kingdom of Iraq

Republic of Iraq (1958-2003)

References 

Iraqi Ground Forces officers
Chiefs of defence
Military of Iraq
Iraqi military leaders